Abjat-sur-Bandiat (literally Abjat on Bandiat) is a commune in the Dordogne department in Nouvelle-Aquitaine in southwestern France. The commune was simply known as Abjat until 1975.

Population

Sport
Every year, since 1991, the French conkers championship is held in the village.

See also
Communes of the Dordogne département

References

Communes of Dordogne